Jeju International University is Tamra University and Jeju University of Industry and Information are integrated and open to private universities, located in Jeju, South Korea.
In 1972, it was admitted to Jeju Unemployment College. In 1982, it changed its name from Jeju Unemployment College to Jeju Special Forces College. In 1998, Jeju Junior College changed its name to Jeju Industrial Information College. 
In 1999, Jeju Industrial Information University was established and the Lifelong Education Center was approved the same year. Shim Kyu-ho (10th President) took office and was established as Jeju International University on March 1, 2012.

External links
 Official website
 Official website

See also
List of universities and colleges in South Korea

References 

Jeju City
Universities and colleges in South Korea
Educational institutions established in 1972
1972 establishments in South Korea